Robert King may refer to:

Robert King, 2nd Earl of Kingston (1754–1799), Anglo-Irish peer
Robert King, 4th Earl of Kingston (1796–1867), Irish peer, soldier and Whig politician
Robert King, 6th Earl of Kingston (1804–1869), Anglo-Irish politician and peer
Sir Robert King, 1st Baronet (died 1707), Anglo-Irish politician
Robert King (bishop) (died 1558), English churchman and bishop of Oxford
Robert King (British Army officer) (1904–1983), British general
Robert King (Victorian politician) (1920–1991), Australian politician
Robert King (Queensland politician) (1848–1905), member of the Queensland Legislative Assembly
Robert King (church historian) (1815–1900), Irish clergyman, school teacher and church historian
Robert King (conductor) (born 1960), founder and conductor of the period music orchestra The King's Consort
Jasper King (Robert Jasper Stuart King, 1909–1992), English cricketer
Robert King (cricketer, born 1978), English cricketer
Robert King (dean of Kildare) (1723–1787), Irish Anglican priest
Robert King (economist) (born 1951), American economist
Robert King (footballer) (1862–1950), English international footballer
Robert King (jurist) (1600–1676), English jurist and academic
Robert King (photojournalist), American independent photojournalist
Robert King (writer) (born 1955), co-creator of the TV series The Good Wife
Robert King, victim to a Malo kingi jellyfish which was subsequently named in memory of him
Robert A. King (American football), American football coach in 1890
Robert A. King (composer) (1862–1932), American composer who wrote under pseudonyms including Mary Earl and Betty Chapin
Robert Arthur King (1886–1960), Australian politician
Robert Bruce King (born 1940), American judge
Robert King, 1st Viscount Lorton (1773–1854), Irish peer and politician
Robert Emmet King (1848–1921), mayor of Louisville, Kentucky (1896)
Robert Hillary King (born 1942), American Black Panther member and activist
Robert John King (1839–1899), Australian politician
Robert L. King (born 1946), American political figure
Robert R. King (born 1942), American politician; United States special envoy for North Korean Human Rights Issues 2009
Robert Turner King (1824–1884), cricketer
Robert King, 1st Baron Kingsborough (1724–1755), Irish landowner and politician
Robert T. King (Vermont politician) (1917–1970), Vermont Republican politician
Robert King (Roundhead) (c. 1599–1657), Irish soldier and statesman
Robert King, 2nd Baron Kingston (died 1693), Irish nobleman
Robert King (archdeacon of Kilmacduagh) (fl. 1815–1830), Anglican Archdeacon in Ireland
J. Robert King, American novelist and game designer
Robert King (bowls) (born 1934), Australian lawn bowler
Robert King, frontman of Scottish post-punk band Scars

Rob/Robbie King
Rob King (born 1970), American composer
Robbie King (footballer) (born 1986), English footballer
Robbie King (musician) (1947–2003), Canadian musician
Robbie King (darts player) (born 1993), Australian darts player

Bob/Bobby King
Bob King (American football coach) (1913–1994), active 1958–1972
Bob King (athlete) (1906–1965), American high jumper
Bob King (basketball) (1923–2004), American basketball coach in 1960s and 1970s
Bob King (editor) (born 1949), editor-manager of Classic Images and Films of the Golden Age
Bob King (labor leader) (born 1946), president of the UAW, 2010–2014
Bob King (New Zealand footballer), New Zealand international football (soccer) player
Bob King (Queensland politician) (born 1938), former Australian politician
Bob King (Australian footballer) (1894–1979), Australian rules football player
Bob King (children's musician), Canadian children's musician and songwriter
Bobby King (born 1944), American singer
Bobby King (musician) (1941–1983), American blues guitarist and singer
Bob P. King (born 1953), America photographer writer, and amateur astronomer
Bob King, writer of the 1971 hit song "Draggin' the Line" performed by Tommy James

See also
Bert King (disambiguation)